

Australia vs Pakistan

Sri Lanka vs West Indies

Australia vs Sri Lanka

Pakistan vs West Indies

Australia vs West Indies

Pakistan vs Sri Lanka

References

External links
 Cricket World Cup 1975 from Cricinfo

B, 1975 Cricket World Cup
1975–76 Australian cricket season